Hyllisia madecassa is a species of beetle in the family Cerambycidae. It was described by Breuning in 1948.

References

madecassa
Beetles described in 1948
Taxa named by Stephan von Breuning (entomologist)